The Dagenham by-election, in Dagenham, on 9 June 1994 was held after Labour Member of Parliament (MP) Bryan Gould resigned the seat. A safe Labour seat, it was won by Judith Church, who retained the seat in 1997.

Candidates
Judith Church had unsuccessfully run for Labour in the 1992 general election in Stevenage.
James Fairrie, the candidate for the Conservative Party, had been educated at Downside School, Royal Military Academy Sandhurst and the University of Exeter. Having served with the Royal Hussars he took a job with an export credit agency whilst also serving as a councillor in the London Borough of Wandsworth from 1981 to 1986. He unsuccessfully contested Newham South in the 1987 general election.
Peter Dunphy, the candidate for the Liberal Democrats, had run unsuccessfully for the party in the 1992 general election for the Hornsey and Wood Green seat. He went on to serve as a councillor for the London Borough of Waltham Forest.
John Tyndall, the British National Party candidate, was party leader at the time and had previously contested a number of general elections for the BNP. His by-election vote share was the BNP's highest score in a Parliamentary by-election which stood until the Sedgefield by-election of July 2007. It was also the first time ever that the party had saved its deposit in a parliamentary election.
Peter Compobassi, the United Kingdom Independence Party candidate, went on to run for the party in Thurrock in the 1997 general election. A seller of hot chestnuts on London's Oxford Street, he has signed up to be one of the 'Metric Martyrs'.
Mark Leighton, the Natural Law Party candidate, ran again in Kingston and Surbiton for the 1997 general election.

Results

The results for the previous election were:

References

Dagenham by-election
Dagenham,1994
Dagenham,1994
Dagenham by-election
Dagenham by-election
Dagenham